Albert Edward Terry (born 17 May 1934), also known by the nickname of "Abe", is an English former professional rugby league footballer who played in the 1950s and 1960s.

Background
Abe Terry was born in St Helens, Lancashire, England, and he worked at the Ravenhead Colliery in St Helens.

Playing career

International honours
Abe Terry won caps for Great Britain while at St. Helens in 1958 against Australia (2 matches), in 1959 against France (2 matches) and Australia (3 matches), in 1960 against France, in 1961 against France (2 matches), and while at Leeds in 1962 against France.

County League appearances
Abe Terry played in St. Helens' victory in the Lancashire County League during the 1959–60 season, and played in Castleford's victory in the Yorkshire County League during the 1964–65 season.

Challenge Cup Final appearances
Abe Terry played left-, i.e. number 8, in St. Helens 12–6 victory over Wigan in the 1961 Challenge Cup Final during the 1960–61 season at Wembley Stadium, London on Saturday 13 May 1961, in front of a crowd of 94,672.

County Cup Final appearances
Abe Terry played left-, i.e. number 8, in St. Helens 2–12 defeat by Oldham in the 1958 Lancashire County Cup Final during the 1958–59 season at Central Park, Wigan on Saturday 25 October 1958, played left- in the 4–5 defeat by Warrington in the 1959 Lancashire County Cup Final during the 1959–60 season at Central Park, Wigan on Saturday 31 October 1959, played left- in the 15–9 victory over Swinton in the 1960 Lancashire County Cup Final during the 1960–61 season at Central Park, Wigan on Saturday 29 October 1960, and played left- in Featherstone Rovers' 0–10 defeat by Halifax in the 1963 Yorkshire County Cup Final during the 1963–64 season at Belle Vue, Wakefield on Saturday 2 November 1963.

BBC2 Floodlit Trophy Final appearances
Abe Terry played left-, i.e. number 8, in Castleford's 4–0 victory over St. Helens in the 1965 BBC2 Floodlit Trophy Final during the 1965–66 season at Knowsley Road, St. Helens on Tuesday 14 December 1965.

Club career
Abe Terry made his début for Featherstone Rovers on Saturday 15 December 1962, and he played his last match for Featherstone Rovers during the 1964–65 season.

Honoured at St Helens R.F.C.
Abe Terry is a St Helens R.F.C. Hall of Fame inductee.

Genealogical information
Albert E. Terry is the younger brother of Mary J. "Josie" Terry, and the older brother of Hugh John Terry, the rugby league forward of the 1950s and 1960s for St. Helens and Blackpool Borough; Frederick W. Terry, Sheila A. Terry, Frances R. Terry, the twins Francis Terry, and William Terry, and James Vincent Terry.

References

External links
!Great Britain Statistics at englandrl.co.uk (statistics currently missing due to not having appeared for both Great Britain, and England)
Photograph "1961 series Great Britain v New Zealand" at rlhp.co.uk

Search for "Abe Terry" at britishnewspaperarchive.co.uk
Search for "Albert Terry" at britishnewspaperarchive.co.uk
Abe Terry Memory Box Search at archive.castigersheritage.com

1934 births
Living people
Castleford Tigers players
English rugby league players
Featherstone Rovers players
Great Britain national rugby league team players
Lancashire rugby league team players
Leeds Rhinos players
Rugby league players from St Helens, Merseyside
Rugby league props
St Helens R.F.C. players